The 1989–90 Providence Friars men's basketball team represented Providence College during the 1989–90 NCAA Division I men's basketball season. Led by second-year head coach Rick Barnes, the Friars finished the season 17–12 (8–8 Big East) and received an at-large bid to the NCAA tournament as the 9 seed in the West region.

Roster

Schedule and results

|-
!colspan=12 style=| Regular Season

|-
!colspan=12 style=| Big East Tournament

|-
!colspan=12 style=| NCAA Tournament

Rankings

NBA draft

References

Providence Friars men's basketball seasons
Providence
Providence